Hoyt Sanford Vandenberg Jr. (born August 12, 1928) is a retired major general in the United States Air Force.

Early life and education
Vandenberg was born in Riverside, California, on August 12, 1928 to Dutch parents.  His father was General Hoyt Vandenberg and his great uncle was U.S. Senator Arthur H. Vandenberg. Vandenberg obtained a Master of Science degree in international relations from George Washington University in 1969.

Military career
Vandenberg graduated from the United States Military Academy in 1951 (where Buzz Aldrin was one of his classmates). In 1953, Vandenberg was assigned to the 86th Fighter-Bomber Wing. Later he would serve as a flight commander with the 413th Tactical Fighter Wing and the 31st Tactical Fighter Wing. He graduated from the Air Command and Staff College in 1961, after which he was assigned to the 4th Tactical Fighter Wing. In 1963, Vandenberg was appointed operations officer with the 23rd Tactical Fighter Squadron. During the Vietnam War, Vandenberg commanded the 390th Tactical Fighter Squadron. Upon returning stateside he was assigned to The Pentagon to work in the Office of the Director of Plans. He would graduate from the National War College in 1969 and return to The Pentagon to work with the Joint Chiefs of Staff. In 1971, Vandenberg became commander of the 12th Flying Training Wing. Vandenberg was named Vice Commandant of Cadets at the United States Air Force Academy in 1972. He would serve as Commandant from 1973 to 1975, during which time he assumed the rank of brigadier general. From 1976 to 1979, Vandenberg served at Headquarters U.S. Air Force, first as Deputy Director of Plans, later as Director of Operations and Readiness, and finally as Assistant Deputy Chief of Staff for Operations, Plans, and Readiness. Vandenberg was ultimately named Vice Commander in Chief of the Pacific Air Forces. His retirement was effective as of January 1, 1981.

Awards and decorations

Inducted in the National Aviation Hall of Fame in Dayton, Ohio.

Meeting Charles Lindbergh
In an interview with journalist David Leighton, published in the Arizona Daily Star newspaper, on May 27, 2014, Vandenberg shared this story about meeting well-known aviator Charles Lindbergh:

References

External links
David Leighton, "Street Smarts: Retired Tucsonan a decorated fighter pilot, leader in the Air Force," Arizona Daily Star, May 27,2014

People from Riverside, California
United States Air Force generals
Recipients of the Air Force Distinguished Service Medal
Recipients of the Silver Star
Recipients of the Legion of Merit
Recipients of the Distinguished Flying Cross (United States)
Recipients of the Air Medal
Recipients of the Gallantry Cross (Vietnam)
United States Air Force personnel of the Vietnam War
George Washington University alumni
United States Military Academy alumni
Elliott School of International Affairs alumni
1928 births
Living people
Military personnel from California